Gye of Baekje (died 346, r. 344–346) was the twelfth king of Baekje, one of the Three Kingdoms of Korea.

Background
He was the eldest son of the 10th king Bunseo, who was assassinated in 304. The Samguk Sagi records that "he was naturally hard and brace, and skilled with horse and bow. When Bunseo died, Gye was too young to succeed him, so Biryu (younger brother of the 7th king Saban) succeeded him, dying in the 41st year of his own reign. Then Gye succeeded him".

Reign
His rule indicated the continued the rivalry between two royal lines, that of the 5th king Chogo and that of the 8th king Goi, from whom Gye descended. The Goi line ended with Gye's 2-year reign, as he was succeeded by Biryu's son Geunchogo.

Samguk Sagi:
 346 AD, autumn, ninth month. The king died.

Family
 Father: Bunseo of Baekje
 Mother: unknown
 Queen: unknown
 Children: Buyeo Min
           Buyeo Mun
           Buyeo Hwa

Popular culture
 Portrayed by Han Jin-hee in the 2010-2011 KBS1 TV series The King of Legend.

See also
List of monarchs of Korea
History of Korea

References
  Content in this article was copied from Samguk Sagi Scroll 23 at the Shoki Wiki, which is licensed under the Creative Commons Attribution-Share Alike 3.0 (Unported) (CC-BY-SA 3.0) license.

346 deaths
Baekje rulers
4th-century monarchs in Asia
Year of birth unknown
4th-century Korean people